The men's long jump at the 2018 IAAF World U20 Championships was held at Ratina Stadium in Tampere, Finland on 10 and 11 July.

Records

Results

Qualification
The qualification round took place on 10 July, in two groups, both starting at 11:20. Athletes attaining a mark of at least 7.70 metres ( Q ) or at least the 12 best performers ( q ) qualified for the final.

Final
The final was held on 11 July at 17:56.

References

long jump
Long jump at the World Athletics U20 Championships